Rebaste  is a village in Kanepi Parish, Põlva County in southeastern Estonia.

Aalupi Lake is located in Rebaste village. Also Pokuland is located in the village.

References

 

Villages in Põlva County